The men's 200 metre butterfly event at the 1960 Olympic Games took place on August 31 and September 2 in Rome, Italy. This swimming event used the butterfly stroke. This race consisted of four lengths of the Stadio Olympico del Nuoto, a 50m Olympic size swimming pool.

Medalists

Results

Heats

Five heats were held; the fastest sixteen swimmers advanced to the Semifinals.  Because there was a tie for sixteenth place, a swim-off was held to determine the sixteenth swimmer to advance.

Key

Heat One

Heat Two

Heat Three

Heat Four

Heat Five

Swim-Off

Semifinals

Two heats were held; the fastest eight swimmers advanced to the Finals.  Those that advanced are highlighted.

Semifinal One

Semifinal Two

Final

Key: WR = World record

References

Men's buterfly 200 metre
Men's events at the 1960 Summer Olympics